Sandra Jeanne Feuerstein (January 21, 1946 – April 9, 2021) was a United States district judge of the United States District Court for the Eastern District of New York.

Education and career

Born in New York City, New York, Feuerstein received a Bachelor of Science degree from the University of Vermont in 1966 and a Juris Doctor from the Benjamin N. Cardozo School of Law at Yeshiva University in 1979. She was a teacher in the New York Public School System (Frances X. Hegarty Elementary School/Island Park)from 1966 to 1971. She was a law clerk in the New York Supreme Court Law Department from 1980 to 1985, and to Judge Leo H. McGinity, New York State Appellate Division, from 1985 to 1987. She was a judge on the Nassau County District Court from 1987 to 1994. She then served as a justice of the New York Supreme Court Tenth Judicial District from 1994 to 1999, and as an associate justice of the New York Supreme Court Appellate Division Second Judicial Department from 1999 to 2003.

Federal judicial service

She was nominated to the federal bench by George W. Bush on January 7, 2003, to a seat vacated by Thomas Collier Platt Jr., confirmed by the United States Senate on September 17, 2003, and received her commission on September 22, 2003. She assumed senior status on January 21, 2015.

Personal life
She was the daughter of Judge Annette Elstein (June 30, 1920 – April 6, 2020). Feuerstein and Elstein were believed to be the first mother-daughter judges in United States history.

Feuerstein died on April 9, 2021, after being struck by a car driven by Nastasia Snape in a hit and run incident in Boca Raton, Florida.

See also
 List of Jewish American jurists

References

External links

Picture and biographical information (https://larc.cardozo.yu.edu/cardozo-life/10/)
Ratings by Attorneys (http://www.therobingroom.com/Judge.aspx?ID=7) Numerical Breakdown
Personal Rules of Court (http://www.nyed.uscourts.gov/pub/rules/SJF-MLR.pdf)

1946 births
2021 deaths
Judges of the United States District Court for the Eastern District of New York
United States district court judges appointed by George W. Bush
21st-century American judges
University of Vermont alumni
Benjamin N. Cardozo School of Law alumni
21st-century American women judges
Pedestrian road incident deaths
Road incident deaths in Florida